Vatapá (Yoruba: vata'pa) is an Afro-Brazilian dish made from bread, shrimp, coconut milk, finely ground peanuts and palm oil mashed into a creamy paste. It is a typical food of Salvador, Bahia and it is also common to the North and Northeast regions of Brazil. In the northeastern state of Bahia it is commonly eaten with acarajé, and as a ritual offering in Candomblé, with acaçá or acarajé. Vatapá is often eaten with white rice in other regions of Brazil. The shrimp can be replaced with ground tuna, chicken or cod among other options.

Etymology
"Vatapá" is probably derived from the term Yoruba vata'pa. In Hausa, as well as Yoruba, the collocantion wa ta ba can be found, which means in both languages for her.

Origin

Vatapá is of African origin, and arrived in Brazil through the Yoruba people with the name of  ehba-tápa.

It is a typical dish of the northeastern cuisine and very traditional in the state of Bahia, where palm oil is an ingredient and the dish is frequently served with caruru. It is also popular in Amazonas, in Amapá and Pará, where the recipe suffers variations such as the absence of peanuts and other common ingredients in the traditional version. Vatapá shows the influence of African cuisine brought by the Africans enslaved in slave ships starting in the 16th century. With the ingredients found in this new land and the need to supplement their food diet, they developed other dishes, which became typical of Brazilian cuisine.

See also 

Matapa
List of Brazilian dishes

References

Brazilian cuisine
Condiments